Guangximen Station is a station on Line 13 of the Beijing Subway. It is located south of the interchange of North 3rd Ring Road East and the southern terminus of the Jingcheng Expressway, known as Taiyanggong Bridge.

Station layout 
The station has 2 at-grade side platforms.

Exits 
There are 2 exits, lettered A and B. Exit A is accessible.

References

External links

Beijing Subway stations in Chaoyang District